George D. Chryssides (born 1945) is a British academic and researcher on new religious movements and cults, has taught at several British universities, becoming head of Religious studies at the University of Wolverhampton in 2001. He is an honorary research fellow in contemporary religion at York St John University and the University of Birmingham.

Chryssides is the author of several books and articles, with an interest in the academic study of new religious movements. He is president of the International Society for the Study of New Religions, and a Governor of Inform (Information Network Focus on Religious Movements), based at King's College London.

Biography

Education 
Chryssides holds a first-class honours B.D. in systematic theology from the University of Glasgow. He obtained a first-class honours MA degree in philosophy at the University of Glasgow. Since 1974, Chryssides holds a Ph.D. in philosophy of religion from the University of Oxford, with the thesis An examination of some problems concerning the philosophical analysis of religious language.

Teaching 
He has taught at various British universities and was Head of Religious Studies at the University of Wolverhampton from 2001 to 2008.

Academic work

Definition of new religious movements 
From the 1980, Chryssides's main interest has been new religious movements. Chryssides favours a simple definition of "new religious movement" as an organization founded "within the past 150 or so years" that cannot be easily classified within one of the world's main religious traditions.

Study of Jehovah's Witnesses 
Chryssides has been described by fellow sociologist James T. Richardson as "one of the leading scholars" of Jehovah's Witnesses.

According to Chryssides, hostile criticism of Jehovah's Witnesses from ex-members who seek to discredit the Watch Tower Society are lacking because Jehovah's Witnesses tend to avoid outside reading, so outsiders tend to be unaware of outside scholarship. Chryssides has said that he learned useful information from critical ex-members of the Jehovah's Witnesses although accounts by critical former members may be biased.

Works

Thesis

Books

Articles

References

External links
 Official website: Religion in the 21st Century

1945 births
Academics of the University of Birmingham
Academics of the University of Wolverhampton
Living people
Researchers of new religious movements and cults